Anna Elizabeth Jerome Spencer  (16 November 1872 – 23 October 1955) was a notable New Zealand school principal, orchardist and community leader. She was born in Napier, New Zealand, in 1872.

Spencer founded the New Zealand Federation of Women's Institutes in 1921, being inspired to do so after attending a craft exhibition in London in 1919.

In the 1937 New Year Honours, Spencer was appointed an Officer of the Order of the British Empire, for social welfare services.

In February 2021 a bronze statue of Spencer was unveiled in Napier.

References

1872 births
1955 deaths
New Zealand schoolteachers
New Zealand horticulturists
People from Napier, New Zealand
New Zealand orchardists
New Zealand Officers of the Order of the British Empire